Hugo Miguel Gomes Moreira (born 12 April 1982) is a Portuguese retired professional footballer who played as a winger.

Club career
Born in Matosinhos, Moreira played youth football with Leixões S.C. and FC Porto, making his debut as a senior with the latter's reserves in 2000. From there onwards until 2008, he alternated between the second and the third divisions, representing C.F. União de Lamas, F.C. Pedras Rubras, C.D. Pinhalnovense, SC Dragões Sandinenses and S.C. Espinho.

Subsequently, Moreira spent seven consecutive seasons in the second tier, at the service of F.C. Vizela, UD Oliveirense, C.D. Santa Clara, S.C. Covilhã, Leixões and C.D. Feirense. He retired in 2016, at the age of 34.

References

External links
 
 National team data 
 

1982 births
Living people
Sportspeople from Matosinhos
Portuguese footballers
Association football wingers
Liga Portugal 2 players
Segunda Divisão players
Leixões S.C. players
FC Porto B players
C.F. União de Lamas players
C.D. Pinhalnovense players
S.C. Dragões Sandinenses players
S.C. Espinho players
F.C. Vizela players
U.D. Oliveirense players
C.D. Santa Clara players
S.C. Covilhã players
C.D. Feirense players
C.D. Trofense players
Portugal youth international footballers